The Moon Mineralogy Mapper (M3) is one of two instruments that NASA contributed to India's first mission to the Moon, Chandrayaan-1, launched October 22, 2008. It is an imaging spectrometer, and the team is led by Principal investigator Carle Pieters of Brown University, and managed by NASA's Jet Propulsion Laboratory.

Description 

M3 is an imaging spectrometer that provided the first high-resolution spatial and spectral map of the entire lunar surface, revealing the minerals of which it is made. This information will both provide clues to the early development of the Solar System and guide future astronauts to stores of precious resources.

This instrument is a Discovery Program "Mission of Opportunity" (a NASA-designed instrument on board another space agency's spacecraft).

Chandrayaan-1 operated for 312 days as opposed to the intended two years but the mission achieved many of its planned objectives. M3 was used to map over 95% of the lunar surface in its low-resolution Global mode, but only a small fraction in the high-resolution Target mode. After suffering from several technical issues including failure of the star sensors and poor thermal shielding, Chandrayaan-1 stopped sending radio signals at 1:30 AM IST on 29 August 2009 shortly after which, the ISRO officially declared the mission over.

Science team 

Carle M. Pieters, Brown University - PI (principal investigator)
Joe Boardman, Analytical Imaging and Geophysics, LLC
Bonnie Buratti, JPL
Roger Clark, USGS
Robert Green, JPL
Jim Head, Brown University
Sarah Lundeen, JPL - Instrument Ground Data System
Erick Malaret, ACT
Tom McCord, University of Hawaii
Jack Mustard, Brown University
Cass Runyon, College of Charleston
Matt Staid, Planetary Science Institute
Jessica Sunshine, University of Maryland
Larry Taylor, University of Tennessee
Stefanie Tompkins, SAIC
Padma Varanasi, JPL - Mission Operations

Water discovered on Moon

On September 24, 2009, Science magazine reported that NASA's Moon Mineralogy Mapper (M3) on Chandrayaan-1 had detected water on the Moon. But, on 25 September 2009, ISRO announced that the MIP, another instrument on-board Chandrayaan-1 also had discovered water on the Moon just before impact and had discovered it before M3. The announcement of this discovery was not made until NASA confirmed it.

M3 detected absorption features near 2.8-3.0 µm on the surface of the Moon. For silicate bodies, such features are typically attributed to OH- and/or H2O-bearing materials. On the Moon, the feature is seen as a widely distributed absorption that appears strongest at cooler high latitudes and at several fresh feldspathic craters. The general lack of correlation of this feature in sunlit M3 data with neutron spectrometer H abundance data suggests that the formation and retention of OH and H2O is an ongoing surficial process. OH/H2O production processes may feed polar cold traps and make the lunar regolith a candidate source of volatiles for human exploration.

The Moon Mineralogy Mapper (M3), an imaging spectrometer, was one of the 11 instruments on board Chandrayaan-I that came to a premature end on August 29. M3 was aimed at providing the first mineral map of the entire lunar surface.

Lunar scientists have for decades contended with the possibility of water repositories. They are now increasingly "confident that the decades-long debate is over," a report says. "The moon, in fact, has water in all sorts of places; not just locked up in minerals, but scattered throughout the broken-up surface, and, potentially, in blocks or sheets of ice at depth." The results from the NASA's Lunar Reconnaissance Orbiter are also "offering a wide array of watery signals."

The detailed analysis of the full set of Moon Mineralogy Mapper data in 2018 has yielded multiple locations with water ice concentrations at the surface ranging from 2% to 30%, at latitudes above 70 degrees. Surprisingly, some of the known "cold traps", including the impact site of the LCROSS spent stage, have failed to detect surface ice.

Mg-spinel-rich rock discovered 
M3 found a rock dominated by Mg-spinel with no detectable pyroxene or olivine present (<5%) occurring along the western inner ring of Moscoviense Basin (as one of several discrete areas). The occurrence of this spinel does not easily fit with current lunar-crustal evolution models.

References

External links 
 Jet Propulsion Laboratory's website for M3

Discovery Program